Carlos Monteverde (2 September 1919 – 19 July 2000) was a Venezuelan sports shooter. He competed at the 1952 Summer Olympics, 1956 Summer Olympics and 1960 Summer Olympics.

References

1919 births
2000 deaths
Venezuelan male sport shooters
Olympic shooters of Venezuela
Shooters at the 1952 Summer Olympics
Shooters at the 1956 Summer Olympics
Shooters at the 1960 Summer Olympics
Sportspeople from Caracas
Pan American Games silver medalists for Venezuela
Pan American Games bronze medalists for Venezuela
Pan American Games medalists in shooting
Shooters at the 1955 Pan American Games
Shooters at the 1959 Pan American Games
20th-century Venezuelan people